Roman Macek (born 18 April 1997) is a Czech football player who plays as a midfielder in Switzerland for Lugano.

Club career
He made his professional debut in the Serie B for Bari on 21 January 2017 in a game against Cittadella.

On 31 August 2018, he joined Lugano in the Swiss Super League on a season-long loan.

On 27 January 2019, Macek signed a contract with Lugano until 30 June 2022. On 24 August 2020, Macek signed a new contract with Lugano until 30 June 2025. On 25 August 2021, Lugano announced that they are forced to release Macek due to Swiss league regulations. However, in October 2021 he appeared for Lugano's reserve squad Team Ticino U21 that plays in the fourth-tier Swiss 1. Liga. On 30 October 2021, he suffered an ACL tear which kept him from playing for almost a year. He returned to the main Lugano squad in the 2022–23 season.

References

External links
 
 

1997 births
Sportspeople from Zlín
Living people
Czech footballers
Association football midfielders
Czech Republic youth international footballers
Czech Republic under-21 international footballers
S.S.C. Bari players
U.S. Cremonese players
FC Lugano players
Serie B players
Swiss Super League players
2. Liga Interregional players
Swiss 1. Liga (football) players
Czech expatriate footballers
Expatriate footballers in Italy
Czech expatriate sportspeople in Italy
Expatriate footballers in Switzerland
Czech expatriate sportspeople in Switzerland